This is a list of major hydroelectric power station failures due to damage to a hydroelectric power station or its connections.  Every generating station trips from time to time due to minor defects and can usually be restarted when the defect has been remedied. Various protections are built into the stations to cause shutdown before major damage is caused. Some hydroelectric power station failures may go beyond the immediate loss of generation capacity, including destruction of the turbine itself, reservoir breach and significant destruction of national grid infrastructure downstream.  These can take years to remedy in some cases.

Where a generating station is large compared to the connected grid capacity, any failure can cause extensive disruption within the network.  A serious failure in a proportionally large hydroelectric generating station or its associated transmission line will remove a large block of power from the grid that may lead to widespread disturbances.

List of failures

See also

 Dam failure
 List of power outages
 Hydraulic engineering
 Hydroelectricity
 List of significant thermal power station failures
 Operation Chastise
 Malpasset Dam
 St. Francis Dam

References

Electric power-related lists
Failures